Midway, Alabama is a town in Bullock County, Alabama, United States.

Midway, Alabama may also refer to:
Midway, Butler County, Alabama, a place in Alabama
Midway, Chilton County, Alabama, a place in Alabama
Midway, Clarke County, Alabama, a place in Alabama
Midway, Colbert County, Alabama, a place in Alabama
Midway, Lawrence County, Alabama, a place in Alabama
Midway, Monroe County, Alabama, on the Alabama State Route 83
Midway, Wilcox County, Alabama, a place in Alabama